Polder is a low-lying tract of land enclosed by embankments known as dikes, that forms an artificial hydrological entity.

Polder may also refer to:
POLDER, an environmental satellite radiometer

People with the surname
Dirk Polder (1919–2001), Dutch physicist
Tessa Polder (born 1997), Dutch volleyball player

See also
Polder Model, the Dutch version of consensus policy in economics

de:Polder